SQR Development is an American stock car racing team that is currently scheduled to compete part-time in the NASCAR Xfinity Series, fielding the No. 87 Toyota Supra. The team is currently owned by J. C. Stout, current New York governor candidate who founded the team in 2021 after previous experience with his another team he owned, Stellar Quest Racing.

NASCAR Xfinity Series

Car No. 87 history 
On December 20, 2021, former driver J. C. Stout would announce that he had formed a new team with chassis bought from Joe Gibbs Racing, with the team planning to run 10-12 races that year.

On January 20, 2022, the team announced that they would sign former Kyle Busch Motorsports and GMS Racing driver Raphaël Lessard for select races for the season. However, on March 29, 2022, Lessard revealed that the team would not compete in 2022 due to an "unfortunate personal matter".

Car No. 87 results

References

External links 
 

American auto racing teams
NASCAR teams
Auto racing teams established in 2021